Cossano Canavese is a comune (municipality) in the Metropolitan City of Turin in the Italian region Piedmont, located about  northeast of Turin.

Cossano Canavese borders the following municipalities: Caravino, Settimo Rottaro, Borgo d'Ale and Borgomasino.

References

Cities and towns in Piedmont